A kadiluk, in some cases equivalent to a kaza, was a local administrative subdivision of the Ottoman empire, which was the territory of a kadı, or judge.

There could be several kadiluks in a sanjak. The kadı's duties extended beyond those of a modern judge; in addition to law enforcement, kadiluks were involved in matters such as taxation and conscription.

Although every kaza had a kadı, not every kadı was in charge of a kaza; a kadı's position moved, over time, with demographic and political changes. In the Tanzimat reforms of 1864, kadiluks were decoupled from kazas.

See also
Subdivisions of the Ottoman Empire
Sanjak
Agaluk
Qadaa
Qadiyat

References

Subdivisions of the Ottoman Empire
Types of administrative division
Turkish words and phrases
Former types of subdivisions of Bosnia and Herzegovina
Islamic courts and tribunals